Louis I (1272 – 22 July 1322) was suo jure Count of Nevers and jure uxoris Count of Rethel.

Louis was a son of Robert III, Count of Flanders, and Yolande, Countess of Nevers. He succeeded his parents as Count of Nevers. In December 1290, he married Joan, Countess of Rethel, and thus became her co-ruler in the County of Rethel. They had two children:
Joanna of Flanders
Louis I, Count of Flanders, Nevers and Rethel

He died in Paris shortly before his father and thus never succeeded his father as Count of Flanders.

References

Counts of Rethel
Counts of Nevers
House of Dampierre
1272 births
1322 deaths
Jure uxoris officeholders
Heirs apparent who never acceded